SMS Graudenz was the lead ship of her class of light cruisers. She had one sister ship, . The ship was built by the German Kaiserliche Marine (Imperial Navy) in the Kaiserliche Werft shipyard in Kiel, laid down in 1912 and commissioned into the High Seas Fleet in August 1914, days after the outbreak of World War I. She was named for the then-German town of Graudenz (now Grudziądz, Poland).

Graudenz saw extensive service during World War I, including serving as part of the reconnaissance screen for the battlecruisers of the I Scouting Group during the raid on Scarborough, Hartlepool and Whitby in December 1914. The ship also took part in the Battle of Dogger Bank in January 1915, and the Battle of the Gulf of Riga in August 1915. She had been damaged by a mine and was unable to participate in the Battle of Jutland in May 1916. She was assigned to the planned final operation of the High Seas Fleet in October 1918, weeks before the end of the war, but a major mutiny forced the cancellation of the plan. After the end of the war, the ship was ceded to Italy as a war prize and commissioned into the Italian Navy as Ancona; she remained in service until 1937 when she was stricken and broken up for scrap.

Design

She displaced  at full load. Her propulsion system consisted of two sets of Marine steam turbines driving two  propellers. They were designed to give . These were powered by ten coal-fired Marine-type water-tube boilers and two oil-fired double-ended boilers. She had a crew of 21 officers and 364 enlisted men.

The ship was armed with twelve  SK L/45 guns in single pedestal mounts. Two were placed side by side forward on the forecastle, eight were located amidships, four on either side, and two in a superfiring pair aft. These were later replaced with seven  SK L/45 guns and two  SK L/45 anti-aircraft guns. She was also equipped with a pair of  torpedo tubes with five torpedoes submerged in the hull on the broadside. Two deck-mounted launchers were added when the gun armament was upgraded. She could also carry 120 mines.

Service history
Graudenz was ordered under the contract name "Ersatz " and was laid down at the Kaiserliche Werft shipyard in Kiel in 1912 and was launched on 25 October 1913. At her launching, the mayor of Graudenz, Dr. Kühnast, christened the ship. She was commissioned into the High Seas Fleet on 10 August 1914.

World War I
Graudenzs first operation was the raid on Yarmouth on 3 November 1914. The bombardment was conducted without incident, but on the return, the armored cruiser  struck a German mine outside Wilhelmshaven and sank. She was also present for the raid on Scarborough, Hartlepool and Whitby on 15–16 December 1914. After completing the bombardment of the towns, the Germans began to withdraw, though British forces moved to intercept them. Graudenz, Stralsund, Strassburg, and two flotillas of torpedo boats steamed between two British squadrons. The Germans were able to use the bad weather to cover their withdrawal. Graudenz again screened for the I Scouting Group for the sortie out to the Dogger Bank on 24 January 1915. In the ensuing Battle of Dogger Bank, the large armored cruiser  was sunk.

In August 1915, Graudenz went into the Baltic for a major operation to clear the Gulf of Riga of Russian naval forces. Eight dreadnoughts and three battlecruisers from the High Seas Fleet were detached for the operation. The minesweepers cleared the Russian minefields by the 20th, allowing the German squadron to enter the Gulf. The Russians had by this time withdrawn to Moon Sound, and the threat of Russian submarines and mines in the Gulf prompted the Germans to retreat. The major units of the High Seas Fleet were back in the North Sea before the end of August. Graudenz struck a mine on the night of 21/22 April 1916, and was in drydock for repairs in May 1916. As a result, she was unavailable for the fleet operation that resulted in the Battle of Jutland on 31 May − 1 June 1916. For the remainder of the war, she served as a torpedo boat flotilla leader.

By October 1918, Graudenz was assigned to the II Scouting Group, which was to participate in a final, climactic attack by the High Seas Fleet. The planned operation called for raids on Allied shipping in the Thames estuary and Flanders to draw out the Grand Fleet. On the morning of 29 October 1918, the order was given to sail from Wilhelmshaven the following day. The unrest ultimately forced Hipper and Scheer to cancel the operation. Commodore Andreas Michelsen organized a force of light craft, including light cruisers, destroyers, and U-boats to oppose a possible British attack while the heavy units of the fleet were in disarray; he chose Graudenz as his flagship.

Italian service
Graudenz served with the newly reorganized Reichsmarine in the aftermath of the war, through 1919. She was stricken from the naval register on 10 March 1920 and surrendered to the Allies as a war prize. She was transferred to Italy on 1 June 1920 under the name "E" in the French port of Cherbourg. She was placed in Italian service and renamed Ancona. She was overhauled starting in 1921 through 1924, during which she was partially re-boilered with six oil-fired models, and the remaining six boilers were modified to allow coal or oil burning. She also had her superfiring 15 cm gun moved amidships, but in 1926 it was moved back to clear room for a platform to hold a scout plane. She initially carried a Macchi M.7, which was later replaced by a CANT 25AR.

Ancona was commissioned into the Italian Navy on 6 May 1925. She was modified extensively in 1928–1929, during which a fixed aircraft catapult was installed in the bow. The modifications required a longer bow to fit the catapult, so a longer clipper bow was installed. The Italians had trouble maintaining the ex-German ships, however, and Ancona was not in particularly good condition, so she was laid up in Taranto after her last cruise in August 1932.

Ancona thereafter served as a source of spare parts for Bari and Taranto. The navy considered rebuilding Ancona for service in the Italian colonial empire in early 1936, as Bari and Taranto had been. She was to have had her after boilers removed and the remaining boilers replaced with new oil-fired units that would have been ducted into a single large funnel. A trio of  40-caliber (cal.) anti-aircraft guns were to have been installed. The plan came to nothing due to the cost of the reconstruction, and in April another proposal to convert her into an anti-aircraft floating battery was considered. This would have provided space for twenty-six  47-cal. guns in twin mounts and a fire-control director. The cost of the conversion proved to be excessive, as did a third option that would have seen her receive a new propulsion system for use as an escort vessel. As the ship had no further use, she was stricken from the naval register on 11 March 1937 and sold for scrap, being broken up in 1938.

Notes

References

Further reading

External links
 Ancona Marina Militare website 

Graudenz-class cruisers
Ships built in Kiel
1913 ships
World War I cruisers of Germany
Cruisers of the Regia Marina